Pirates of the Caribbean: Dead Men Tell No Tales (released internationally as Pirates of the Caribbean: Salazar's Revenge) is a 2017 American swashbuckler fantasy film directed by Joachim Rønning and Espen Sandberg and written by Jeff Nathanson, from a story by Nathanson and Terry Rossio. Produced by Jerry Bruckheimer and distributed by Walt Disney Studios Motion Pictures, the film is the standalone sequel to On Stranger Tides (2011) and the fifth installment in the Pirates of the Caribbean film series. It stars Johnny Depp, Javier Bardem, Geoffrey Rush, Brenton Thwaites, Kaya Scodelario, and Kevin McNally.

The filmmakers cited the series' first installment, The Curse of the Black Pearl (2003), as inspiration for the script and tone of the film, with critics describing the film as a "requel". Pre-production for the film started shortly before On Stranger Tides was released in early 2011, with Terry Rossio writing the initial script. In early 2013, Jeff Nathanson was hired to write a new script for the film, with Depp being involved in Nathanson's writing process. Initially planned for a 2015 release, the film was delayed to 2016 and then to 2017, due to script and budget issues. Principal photography started in Australia in February 2015, after the Australian government offered Disney $20 million in tax incentives, and ended in July 2015.

Dead Men Tell No Tales premiered in Shanghai on May 11, 2017, and was released in the United States on May 26. The film received generally negative reviews from critics and grossed $795 million worldwide against a production budget between $230–320 million.

Plot

Thirteen years after the battle of Calypso's maelstrom, a twelve-year-old Henry Turner boards the Flying Dutchman and informs his father, Will, that the curse which binds Will to the Dutchman and only permits him to step on land once a decade can be broken by the Trident of Poseidon. Henry intends to recruit Captain Jack Sparrow to help find it, but Will believes this is impossible and orders Henry to leave. Will and the Dutchman then disappear into the sea, but Henry vows to find Jack and the Trident.

Nine years later, Henry is a sailor in the Royal Navy. The ship sails into the supernatural Devil's Triangle and stumbles upon the wreck of the Silent Mary, whose ghostly crew led by Spanish pirate-hunter, Captain Armando Salazar, attacks, killing the entire crew but leaving Henry as the sole survivor so that he can deliver a message to Jack, who killed Salazar and his crew decades ago by leading them to the Devil’s Triangle and inadvertently cursed them.

On Saint Martin, a young astronomer named Carina Smyth is sentenced to death for witchcraft but escapes and crosses paths with Jack as he and his crew botch a bank robbery, suffering from a spell of bad luck. Jack later trades his compass for a drink, an act that destroys the Devil's Triangle and frees Salazar and his crew once more. Carina learns Henry is looking for the Trident's location and offers to help him using her unknown father's diary. Carina and Jack stall the execution process, but they escape with the help of Henry and Jack's crew, setting sail on the Dying Gull. Carina deciphers the clues in her diary, discovering that the stars will lead to an island where the Trident is hidden.

Meanwhile, Captain Hector Barbossa hears from his pirate crew that the revived Captain Salazar has killed several pirates at sea and is destroying Barbossa's fleet. Barbossa talks his way out of being killed by offering to help find Jack and learns that the Trident could lead him to a "treasure". Salazar agrees, wanting revenge on Jack. Salazar pursues the Dying Gull, forcing Jack, Henry, and Carina to flee to an island, discovering that Salazar's crew cannot go on land. Barbossa allies himself with Jack, returning his compass and restoring the miniaturized Black Pearl to its original size. They continue their journey to the island, with Barbossa taking command of the Pearl once more. During the voyage, Jack and Barbossa realize Carina is the latter's long-lost daughter.

The Pearl approaches the Trident's island and evades a Royal Navy warship until it is destroyed by the Silent Mary before the Pearl runs aground on the island. Jack, Barbossa, and Carina use the island's magic to part the ocean which opens a path to the Trident on the ocean floor. Salazar captures Henry and possesses him to walk on the ocean floor and seize the Trident. Once he does so, Henry is given his body back, and Jack distracts Salazar, allowing Henry to destroy the Trident, breaking all curses upon the sea and restoring Salazar's crew to life. However, the Trident's destruction causes the divided sea to close in on them. The Pearl lowers its anchor to lift the group to safety, but Salazar pursues them, still hell-bent on killing Jack. Carina realizes that Barbossa is her father when she spots a tattoo on his arm identical to the diary's cover, a trident star formation. Barbossa sacrifices himself to kill Salazar, allowing the others to escape.

Sometime later, Henry and Carina reach Port Royal, where Will appears, free from the Dutchman. His wife, Elizabeth Swann, appears moments later and the Turner family reunites. Henry and Carina kiss. Jack watches from the Pearl before sailing away into the horizon, captain once again, while also adopting Captain Barbossa's monkey.

In a post-credits scene, Will and Elizabeth are asleep in their bed, when Davy Jones appears in their room. When he prepares to strike the couple, Will wakes up. Assuming he had a nightmare, he goes back to sleep, oblivious to the wet barnacles on the floor.

Cast

 Johnny Depp as Captain Jack Sparrow:  The former Captain of the Black Pearl who travels with Henry and Carina in search of the Trident of Poseidon. Rønning wanted to focus on relatable characters, as in the first film, "where Jack is not the [lead ... but] comes in and crashes the party every now and then," and to make use of Depp's "comedic genius". The film examines Jack's backstory, with the young Jack portrayed by Anthony De La Torre, whose face was replaced by a CGI replica of Depp as he looked in 21 Jump Street and What's Eating Gilbert Grape (1993). Rønning felt de-aging Depp was tricky against the canon of the franchise.
 Javier Bardem as Captain Armando Salazar:  The undead Captain of the Silent Mary who seeks revenge on Jack Sparrow and attempts to steal the Trident of Poseidon to kill every pirate at sea. Bardem set out to imbue the character with "a rage based on dented pride," owing to his spectacular fall, from a high-ranking commander of a Spanish fleet to being betrayed and trapped in hell by Jack. With Salazar's body language, he tried to convey a bull in an arena, "full of rage and need of vengeance, but also wounded." It took three hours a day to apply the make-up, which Bardem referred to as having "cold chicken breasts" glued to his face.
 Geoffrey Rush as Captain Hector Barbossa: Sparrow's rival and the Captain of the Queen Anne's Revenge.
 Brenton Thwaites as Henry Turner:  The son of Will Turner and Elizabeth Swann who vows to break his father's curse by searching for the Trident. The directors were keen to draft a new protagonist relationship with Henry and Carina, stating that "in the middle of a big action scene, you need to be able to lean on the characters and find the heart of that story, and channel the characters' vulnerability." Rønning noted that identity is a major theme in the film, and to Henry and Carina's story arc: "they are on a similar quest and find common ground in looking for who they are." Lewis McGowan portrays a young Henry.
 Kaya Scodelario as Carina Smyth Barbossa:  A headstrong, altruistic astronomer who was wrongly accused of being a witch. Scodelario explained the character's motivation and role, saying, "she is an academic, she's fighting for the right to study at university because women couldn't at that time." Later revealed to be Captain Barbossa's long-lost daughter. For the directors, it was important to "modernise it with Henry and Carina, Kaya, especially brought that with her. She's a modern woman." Scodelario worked with scriptwriter Jeff Nathanson to ensure the character was unique to the series and not a copy of Elizabeth Swann. She said that female characters often "fall into two camps; they are either pretty and perfectly put together or completely insane. Carina has definitely got a little bit of both."
 Kevin McNally as Joshamee Gibbs: Captain Jack's loyal friend and first mate.

Supporting characters appearing in the film include: David Wenham appears as Lieutenant John Scarfield, a Royal Navy officer, who commands HMS Essex; Golshifteh Farahani appears as Shansa, a sea witch; and Stephen Graham, Martin Klebba, Giles New, and Angus Barnett reprise their roles as Scrum, Marty, and Murtogg and Mullroy, respectively, from previous films, as the members of the pirate crew.

Orlando Bloom reprises his role as Will Turner, a blacksmith-turned-pirate who was transformed into the Captain of the Flying Dutchman at the end of At World's End (2007). In preparation for his role, Bloom stated that he would like to portray a character outside of his usual role types as a good-looking hero, alluding to the make-up requirements for Davy Jones, as Bloom having his possible return in the franchise.

Keira Knightley briefly appears at the end in a non-speaking role as Elizabeth Swann, Will's wife and Henry's mother, following the "demand" that the character be added after test screenings. Adam Brown, Danny Kirrane, and Delroy Atkinson appear as members of Jack's crew, and in the prison scene, Paul McCartney briefly appears as Jack's paternal uncle, Uncle Jack. A CGI silhouette of Davy Jones is seen in the post-credits scene, but actor Bill Nighy stated that he had not been informed about the character's appearance.

Production

Development
Shortly before the release of On Stranger Tides, the cast and crew of the fourth film were told to set aside time in the near future, because Walt Disney Pictures intended to shoot a fifth and sixth film back-to-back. However, it was later stated that only a fifth film was in the works, with Terry Rossio writing a script for a fifth film without his partner Ted Elliott. Rob Marshall was rumoured to return to direct, but declined after choosing to direct Into the Woods (2014). After Marshall passed on the film, many directors were rumored to take over. Gore Verbinski, who was responsible for the original three films, felt that "there's no reason other than financial" in making the film. The eventual shortlist included Fredrik Bond, Rupert Sanders, and the eventual choice, Norwegian film duo Joachim Rønning and Espen Sandberg. The studio chose them based on their Academy Award-nominated high-sea film Kon-Tiki, and their ability to work with a limited budget.

Rossio's script was ultimately rejected, and the writer stated that a major reason was its use of a female villain, which made actor Johnny Depp "worried that would be redundant to Dark Shadows (2012), which also featured a female villain." In January 2013, Disney hired Jeff Nathanson to work on a script. Rønning and Sandberg said they were particularly moved by Nathanson's "funny and touching" script, which convinced them to sign to direct in May, Rønning believing that the script was "all there" but needed scenes to "carry the tradition of Gore Verbinski, bring the emotional core and big action set pieces." In August, Rønning and Sandberg revealed that the title would be Dead Men Tell No Tales. However, the following month producer Jerry Bruckheimer said, "We have an outline everyone loves but the script is not done," explaining that the release would be postponed beyond summer 2015. The studio questioned Depp's bankability following the financial losses of The Lone Ranger (2013), and the screenplay's first drafts were not approved by Walt Disney Studios chairman Alan Horn, who was concerned about the finished product. Bruckheimer revealed that script and budget issues were behind the delay, and that Nathanson was at work on a second draft, based on a well-received outline, saying they needed a script and budget everyone would approve. Depp was also invited to collaborate on the script, with the actor believing it would be the last of the franchise and wanting to end it right. After the script was accepted, the film was officially green-lit by Disney in July 2014, with a planned release on July 7, 2017.

The directors were inspired by the first film, The Curse of the Black Pearl, stating that the original is thrilling but above all a comedy with heart, and wanted to reinvent the "structure and the dynamics between the characters." In addition to recapturing the best of previous franchise installments, the directors had the works of Charlie Chaplin and Buster Keaton in mind when crafting the tone of the film. The pair wanted the film to be the "most emotional" of the series, and to explore the roots of Jack Sparrow. They decided to use Jack's compass as the "key to unlock Salazar from his hellish prison in the Triangle," and toned down some of the fantastic elements "to ground it, even in Pirates Of The Caribbean [sic]." Geoffrey Rush argued that the pair brought "Euro sensibility to traditional Hollywood franchise thinking," while Orlando Bloom believed that they had "recaptured the simplicity and charm" of the original film. Kaya Scodelario said that the producers wanted to take the franchise back to its origins, with a story that gave characters a conclusion while opening new possibilities. Along with the directors and writers, many of the crew members were new to the franchise, replacing those who had served on the previous four films, with the exception of Bruckheimer, costume designer Penny Rose, and executive producer Chad Oman.

Casting

Speaking at the On Stranger Tides press launch in Cannes, Depp said he would play the role so long as it is popular with the public. In August 2012, news surfaced that Depp had signed for the fifth film, earning A$90 million to reprise his role. One month later, Penélope Cruz stated that in spite of her enjoying playing Angelica in On Stranger Tides, she had not been contacted regarding a fifth film. Geoffrey Rush had commented on returning as Hector Barbossa in the fifth installment, saying "If they keep shapeshifting this character, absolutely," and implied that he might return as the villain. 

Orlando Bloom commented in December 2014, saying that while he was not sure whether he would return as Will Turner, there were talks. He also indicated that Disney could make a soft reboot with the franchise and focus on Will and his son. Both Will Turner's return and Bloom's participation was kept secret until the Disney D23 in 2015, after filming had wrapped. Despite having previously stated that she wouldn't return in 2014, there were reports suggesting that Keira Knightley would reprise her role as Elizabeth Swann due to Will returning. Once the film was shown to test audiences, the filmmakers felt they were "demanded" to reunite both Will and Elizabeth's character. To ensure that Knightley could reprise this role, the production moved for a one-day shoot in London, where she was working.

On December 2, 2013, it was reported that Christoph Waltz was in talks to appear as the film's main antagonist, but he later declined. The villain was eventually portrayed by Cruz's husband, Javier Bardem. In 2014, Bardem signed on to portray Armando Salazar, who in early scripts was referred to as Captain John Brand. Bardem had liked the working environment of the fourth movie, which he witnessed accompanying his wife, and stated he was also a fan of the franchise and of Depp's performance as Jack Sparrow. Australian actor Brenton Thwaites entered talks for the role of Henry in late November 2014, after Disney chose him over Taron Egerton, George MacKay, Mitchell Hope, Ansel Elgort, and Sam Keeley.

Kaya Scodelario was chosen as the female lead out of a shortlist that included Gabriella Wilde, Alexandra Dowling, Jenna Thiam, and Lucy Boynton. Her character, Carina, is an astronomer accused of being a witch. Scodelario confirmed that she was playing "a totally different character" from Elizabeth Swann, and also that she will be Henry's love interest, given in earlier drafts she was envisioned as a love interest of Sparrow. Kevin McNally confirmed his return as Joshamee Gibbs in late January. Adam Brown, Delroy Atkinson, and Danny Kirrane were revealed as cast members shortly before filming. As filming begun, two actors from the previous films were confirmed to return, Martin Klebba as Marty and Stephen Graham as Scrum. Keith Richards expressed interest in reprising his role as Captain Teague, but was unavailable, leading Depp to invite Paul McCartney into appearing as Jack Sparrow's uncle (also named Jack).

Other actors had expressed interest in reprising their roles from the previous films, such as Tia Dalma portrayer Naomie Harris, and Greg Ellis, even if his character Theodore Groves appeared to die in the previous film. Both Lee Arenberg and Mackenzie Crook commented on the possibility of returning as Pintel and Ragetti. In an interview on November 7, 2014, Crook confirmed that he had received a call of availability from Disney for the film, though he later declined in order to focus on his television series Detectorists. He said he had felt "pangs of nostalgia" when the cast and crew filmed without him. Arenberg, who also had a television commitment, to Once Upon a Time, added that he felt like the producers "weren't really trying to court us like they really wanted us."

Filming

Directors Joachim Rønning and Espen Sandberg originally stated that shooting would take place in Puerto Rico and New Orleans, and Bruckheimer had previously mentioned that there might be a sequence in Louisiana. However, a spokesman for Australian Arts Minister George Brandis confirmed that the fifth installment was set to shoot exclusively in Australia after the government agreed to repurpose $20 million of tax incentives, originally intended for the remake of 20,000 Leagues Under the Sea; thus edging out Mexico and South Africa as filming locations. Filming took place exclusively in Queensland, Australia, as the largest production to ever shoot in the country. Village Roadshow Studios and the Whitsunday Islands were officially confirmed as filming locations. On January 1, 2015, The Rainbow Gypsy, a 35-year-old replica of an 1897 Scottish trawler, underwent an extensive refit at the Gold Coast, including a new bowsprit, and reconfigured decks and cabins, for filming as the Dying Gull. Its captain and owner, Kit Woodward, was a rigger in the film.

Filming commenced on February 17, 2015. Ship scenes were filmed in front of a giant outdoor greenscreen in Helensvale, while a film set in the form of a village was built in Maudsland. Because the greenscreens' height blocked the sunlight, containers with inflatable bluescreens mounted on top were added to the set to allow some light to enter. While an initial draft of the script featured six ships, the end product had eleven vessels; to cut costs, most of these were partial constructs later enhanced by computer graphics, with some built atop a hydraulic rig to mimic the movement of seafaring while on land. The camera crew, led by the director of photography Paul Cameron, also made extensive use of drones, to capture immersive views at sea without resorting to aerial footage or cranes.

Filming moved to Doug Jennings Park on the Spit from March 30 to June 15 for water-bound scenes. However, due to extreme sea sickness among the cast and crew from the "big swells," filming moved to Raby Bay for calmer waters. Scenes were shot at Byron Bay on June 1. Locals made up more than 75 percent of the 850-plus crew then working on the film. After much speculation about whether Orlando Bloom would return, Bloom arrived at the Gold Coast in late May to reprise his role as Will Turner. Scenes featuring a skeleton of a sperm whale that had been constructed were shot at Hastings Point from June 21 to 23.

A number of issues and controversies set back the film during its production. The biosecurity laws in Australia posed problems regarding the capuchin monkeys that portray Hector Barbossa's pet monkey Jack, because the animals are regarded as a category 1 pest and call for strict requirements and a 30-day quarantine. Further controversy erupted from animal rights activist groups, who urged Federal Environment Minister Greg Hunt to reject the entry application, arguing that the long air-flight would affect their health, and that their performance was unnatural and would create demand for illegal wildlife trade. The three activist groups were Humane Society International Australia, WildFutures, and the Captive Animals Protection Society (Freedom for Animals/FFA). One of the monkeys caused further disruption when it wandered off set at Movie World, and bit the ear of a make-up artist on another production set for Mako Mermaids.

Crew and cast members were forced to cover the camera lenses on all mobile phones with duct tape to prevent the film from being pirated before its release. To prevent fans from interfering with the production, secret filming locations used the production name of "Herschel" to hide the fact it was the fifth Pirates of the Caribbean film. Following the attempt of an armed man trying to bypass security, the already tight security was increased.

On March 10, 2015, Depp was injured off set and had to be flown to the United States for surgery. Due to his absence, filming stalled completely and 200 crew members were forced to stand down for two weeks, after finishing all they could do without Depp. Depp returned to set on April 21. In June, Kaya Scodelario was injured on set along with a stuntman. In early July, dismantling of the sets at the Spit had begun. Most of the cast and crew had finished on July 8, and a wrap party was held on July 11. Filming then moved to the Whitsundays for the final shots. On July 21, 2015, Rønning announced that filming had wrapped after a 95-day shoot. After nearly a year in post-production, reshoots and additional photography were conducted in Vancouver, Canada from March 24 to April 13, 2016, under the production title "Herschel Additional Photography".

Post-production
Editing was a collaboration between Roger Barton and Leigh Folsom Boyd, with the latter detailing that "Roger started from the beginning of the film and I started from the end, and we kind of met in the middle." Boyd added that it was the longest post-production process she was ever involved with, as Disney wanted to give "the support and leeway we needed to tell the story and allow for the complex visual effects to bake." The editors worked closely with the previsualization team to, according to effects supervisor Gary Brozenich, "give meat to the bones of the plates that needed effects explanation as well as any new CG beats that would be added later." Along with the post-production team in Los Angeles, Brozenich had to split his time going to the UK and Montreal, to check on the eight companies handling the film's 2,000 visual effects shots, with 150 of them consisting only of computer graphics. The primary vendor was Brozenich's own employer Moving Picture Company (MPC). Brozenich stated that what was kept of the original actors was "their run, gait and faces." To provide reference for the floating parts, which were meant to resemble a perpetual drowning state, a stuntman in full costume and wig was filmed underwater in a swimming pool performing various actions.

Atomic Fiction handled the scenes at St. Martin, turning the few blocks of buildings built on set into more than 600 CG buildings, surrounded by a jungle environment. The work combined references from both the Caribbean and Thailand, and enhanced through CGI both the guillotine on which Jack Sparrow is nearly executed and the bank from the heist scene; the bank was meant to look as if its foundations were dug through the ground instead of sliding on the surface. Along with sea footage filmed in both the Australian sets and Key West, Florida, there was extensive usage of water simulations, with the artists using the Beaufort scale to ensure the waves and wind realistically matched.

Music

This was the first film in the series that Hans Zimmer did not compose the music for. Instead, the main composer is one of his protégés, Geoff Zanelli, who had worked on the previous four installments in the franchise. Zanelli said that Zimmer "redefined the sound of the entire genre" and considered it a great accomplishment to have worked with him and Bruckheimer. He used this experience with the franchise to build a new sound for the film. He stated that "you don't have to modernize the melodies, those are timeless," citing one example of how he tried to make the sound more modern by featuring an electric cello to create a menacing leitmotif for Captain Armando Salazar. This was also the first Pirates of the Caribbean score to feature mostly live percussion, as opposed to the programmed percussion in the prior scores. As it took more than a year for the film to start production following Zanelli being hired, he accompanied the script's evolution, and was familiar with the character arcs that he would need to translate in their theme songs. Zanelli always started writing the music on the piano, namely a synthesized orchestra. The film's soundtrack was released on May 26, 2017.

Marketing
A robust marketing effort helped promote Dead Men Tell No Tales. The film was first showcased at the Disney D23 Expo 2015, where Depp appeared in costume as Jack Sparrow and the film's logo was revealed, with Orlando Bloom confirmed to be starring in the film. A 240 page tie-in prequel novel expanding the backstory of the character Carina Smyth was also released, titled Pirates of the Caribbean: Dead Men Tell No Tales – The Brightest Star in the North: The Adventures of Carina Smyth. The film was showcased at the 2016 Walt Disney Content Showcase in South Africa, where concept art, story details and on-set images were previewed.

Release

Theatrical
Dead Men Tell No Tales screened on March 28, 2017 at the 2017 CinemaCon event in Las Vegas. It had its world premiere at the Shanghai Disney Resort in Shanghai on May 11, 2017, and was released in the United States on May 26. In some countries, including the United Kingdom, the film was released as Pirates of the Caribbean: Salazar's Revenge, a decision that the directors were not informed about. It is the first Hollywood feature to be released in the United States for the new panorama-like ScreenX format, which played in two locations in the United States, the CGV Buena Park and the CGV Cinemas in Los Angeles. Additionally, it played in 81 screens at select theaters in Korea, China, Thailand, Vietnam, Turkey, and Indonesia. The film also played in 4D on 373 4DX screens worldwide. The film was released in IMAX in an expanded 1.9:1 aspect ratio.

Home media
Pirates of the Caribbean: Dead Men Tell No Tales was released on digital download by Walt Disney Studios Home Entertainment on September 19, 2017, and on Blu-ray, Ultra HD Blu-ray, and DVD on October 3. It was the top home-media release in its first week, with the Blu-ray version accounting for 78% of sales, and brought the previous four films back into the 25 best-sold Blu-rays.

Reception

Box office
Pirates of the Caribbean: Dead Men Tell No Tales grossed $172 million in the United States and Canada, and $622 million in other territories, for a worldwide total of $795 million, against an estimated production budget of $230 million. It had a worldwide opening of $271.4 million from 55 markets, with $24 million coming from 1,088 IMAX screens. The film's six-day opening gross pushed the franchise gross past the $4 billion mark. Despite being the lowest-grossing film of the series in North America by nearly $70 million and despite scoring the second-lowest nominal gross of the franchise outside North America (only ahead of Curse of the Black Pearl), Dead Men Tell No Tales became the highest-grossing entry of the Pirates franchise outside North America when accounting for foreign-exchange rates, surpassing On Stranger Tides, which grossed $593.4 million at July 2017 rates. The largest-earning foreign markets were China ($172.3 million), Japan ($59.5 million), and Russia and the CIS ($40.7 million), where it was the second-highest-grossing film behind Avatar (2009). Deadline Hollywood noted the film would turn a net profit of around $280 million after factoring together all expenses and revenues based on a projected $850 million final gross (though it would ultimately fall short of that figure, likely resulting in a smaller profit).

United States and Canada
Dead Men Tell No Tales debuted over the four-day Memorial Day opening weekend, being released in 4,276 theaters, of which over 3,100 were 3D, taking advantage of formats such as IMAX, D-Box, and 4DX. The film earned $23.4 million on its first day, including $5.5 million from previews. It was the lowest opening day of the franchise. Dead Men Tell No Tales grossed $63 million over three days, and $78.5 million over four (Friday–Monday), finishing first at the box office, ahead of Guardians of the Galaxy Vol. 2 (2017) and fellow newcomer Baywatch (2017). It was the second-smallest opening weekend of the franchise, only earning more than the first film, with each of the other installments earning at least $90 million. Despite the film registering the highest test score in the series, the opening came in well below expectations of $80–115 million. Analysts attributed the underperformance to negative reviews, franchise fatigue, and Johnny Depp's diminishing returns and depreciating public image, amid his personal problems. Still, it performed better than Disney's previous Memorial Day releases (Prince of Persia: The Sands of Time (2010), Tomorrowland (2015), and Alice Through the Looking Glass (2016)), and studio executives said they were pleased with the movie's opening, which helped Disney push past $1 billion in the US.

The film fell by a total of 65% in its second weekend, the worst of the series, grossing $22.1 million, and finishing in third place, after newcomers Wonder Woman (2017) ($103.3 million) and Captain Underpants: The First Epic Movie (2017) ($23.9 million). It remained in the top ten for four more weeks.

Other territories
Marketed as Salazar's Revenge in most countries, the film was released day-and-date with its debut in 54 markets (91% of its total marketplace, except Japan, where it debuted on July 1). Preliminary reports had the film opening to $150–175 million, but possibly overperforming depending on major markets, most notably China. While its Chinese run benefited from the May 28–30 Dragon Boat Festival—a lucrative moviegoing period—and from International Children's Day (June 1), the Manchester Arena bombing had a deteriorating effect on certain European markets over the film's opening weekend. From Wednesday to Friday, it registered an opening of $208.8 million. Around $14 million of that came from IMAX screenings, the second-biggest international IMAX opening in May, after Captain America: Civil War (2016). Similar to its US plunge, it earned $73.8 million in its second weekend, falling to second place, behind Wonder Woman.

It recorded the biggest opening day of the year in several markets, including Germany ($3.6 million), Austria, France ($2.3 million), Finland, Sweden, Belgium, Thailand ($400,000), Indonesia, Malaysia, and the Netherlands ($900,000). Russia posted the biggest opening of all time with $18.4 million ($18.6 million including previews). In China, where the film had its global premiere, it earned $21.3 million on its opening day, the fourth-biggest Disney opening in the country. It had an 87% marketshare and had already surpassed the entire earnings of Pirates of the Caribbean: At World's End. Earning a total of $67.9 million, it registered the third-highest three-day for any Disney title, and a much-higher opening than the US. The film did extremely well in IMAX, earning $9 million from 401 screens from Friday to early Monday bookings. The robust opening has been attributed to the Dragon Boat Festival, Depp's star power, the ubiquity of the franchise, the impact of Shanghai Disneyland Park, and good word of mouth, with a score of 7.5/10 on reviews aggregator Douban and 8.7/10 on top mobile-ticketing platform Weying. The film's final release market was Japan (July 1), where it opened at number one, achieving the highest-grossing opening for a Western film of the year, earning $9.25 million over the July 1–2 weekend. It retained the box office lead for one more week, and was the highest-grossing foreign film in the following weekend.

Critical response
  Audiences polled by CinemaScore gave the film an average grade of "A−" on an A+ to F scale, and PostTrak reported 81% of those gave the film a positive score.

Mike Ryan of Uproxx criticized what he termed as a convoluted plot and overabundance of characters, resulting in a film that was "practically incoherent." Writing for Rolling Stone, Peter Travers called the film "bloated, boring, repetitive, and draining" and gave it one star out of four. Ignatiy Vishnevetsky of The A.V. Club wrote that the film echoes the first three of the franchise, "in which Johnny Depp's louche and campy Jack Sparrow played second banana to an insipid love story... the two romantic leads ... succeed only in making the shortest movie in the series seem just as long as the rest." A. O. Scott of The New York Times said of the film, "Its pleasures are so meager, its delight in its own inventions so forced and false, that it becomes almost the perfect opposite of entertainment." Michael O'Sullivan of The Washington Post remarked that the film was "loud, overstimulating and hard to take in all in one sitting." Mick LaSalle of San Francisco Chronicle found the film to be "a jumble of half-baked impulses" that had been forced into a played-out franchise.

Richard Roeper of Chicago Sun-Times gave the film three stars out of four, saying: "Dead Men works well enough as a stand-alone, swashbuckling comedic spectacle, thanks to the terrific performances, some ingenious practical effects, impressive CGI and a steady diet of PG-13 dialogue peppered with not particularly sophisticated but (I have to admit) fairly funny sexual innuendo." Pete Hammond of Deadline Hollywood praised the film, calling it "the most entertaining installment," and giving credit to Rønning and Sandberg for creating a "rollicking good time". He praised the visual effects, particularly Salazar and his crew, arguing that the film should be in line to receive an Academy Award for Visual Effects. He also gave high praise to Bardem for being able to create such a "fully dimensional villain" under the layers of make-up and CGI, and Depp for keeping the film and franchise going. Leah Greenblatt of Entertainment Weekly gave the film a 'B', praising the fun nature of the film and its visuals and calling it "gorgeously detailed swashbuckling nonsense," but wished that the script had taken more risks instead of following the formula used in previous films. Ashley Esqueda of CNET gave the film a positive review, arguing that it brought the franchise back to what made its first two installments so fun, and praised Depp's performance as being "delightful as ever." Brian Truitt of USA Today gave the film three stars out of four, saying "What was once a past-its-prime franchise seems to have found new life."

Accolades
At the 38th Golden Raspberry Awards, Pirates of the Caribbean: Dead Men Tell No Tales received nominations for Worst Actor, Worst Supporting Actor, and Worst Screen Combo. Gary Brozenich, Sheldon Stopsack, Patrick Ledda, Richard Clegg, and Richard Little of MPC was nominated for Outstanding Visual Effects – Feature Film at the 2017 Hollywood Post Alliance Awards. The film was nominated for Choice Movie: Action, Choice Movie Actor: Action, Choice Movie Actress: Action, Choice Movie: Villain, Choice Movie: Summer, and Choice Liplock at the 2017 Teen Choice Awards.

Future

Sequel and canceled reboot 
On March 4, 2017, director Joachim Rønning stated that Dead Men Tell No Tales was "only the beginning of the final adventure", indicating that it would not be the last film of the franchise, and that a sixth film could be released. The post-credits scene of Dead Men teases a potential plot involving Davy Jones, who appears in some form while Will and Elizabeth sleep. In September 2017, producer Jerry Bruckheimer indicated that another Pirates sequel would be possible if Dead Men Tell No Tales did well in its home release. In October 2017, the sixth film was confirmed and Kaya Scodelario said that she was contracted to return. Shortly after, it was announced that Rønning was being eyed to return to direct the sequel. In August 2018, the sixth film was still in development.

In October 2018, it was reported that Disney had been looking for ways to reboot the franchise, bringing on Deadpool (2016) writers Rhett Reese and Paul Wernick though producer Jerry Bruckheimer was expected to return. However, in February 2019, Reese and Wernick departed the project and the reboot was cancelled. In May 2020, Bruckheimer commented that the first draft of the screenplay for the sixth film would soon be finished, although he was not sure what role Depp would have in the film. However, in April 2022, in the midst of the trial between Johnny Depp and Amber Heard, Depp revealed that he had no intention of returning to the franchise, citing his strained relationship with Disney after they had removed him from the franchise before a verdict was reached in the case.

In February 2023, Orlando Bloom had expressed interest in returning to the franchise. On March, Keira Knightley explained to Entertainment Tonight why she wouldn't make a return to the Disney franchise. "What about Elizabeth Swann?" Knightley joked when asked if she would re-join the crew. "I mean, she sailed away so nicely. She sailed away in brilliant style." Jerry Bruckheimer also comments about potentially bringing back Johnny Depp's Jack Sparrow to the saga.

Notes

References

External links

 
 
 
 

2010s action adventure films
2010s fantasy action films
2010s fantasy adventure films
American action adventure films
American fantasy action films
American fantasy adventure films
American films about revenge
American ghost films
American sequel films
Films about witchcraft
Films directed by Espen Sandberg
Films directed by Joachim Rønning
Films produced by Jerry Bruckheimer
Films scored by Geoff Zanelli
Films set in the 1750s
Films set in the Caribbean
Films set on fictional islands
Films set on ships
Films shot at Village Roadshow Studios
Films shot in Queensland
Films shot in Vancouver
Films with screenplays by Jeff Nathanson
Films with screenplays by Terry Rossio
IMAX films
Pirates of the Caribbean (film series) films
Treasure hunt films
Walt Disney Pictures films
Flying Dutchman
ScreenX films
4DX films
2010s English-language films
2010s American films